
Gmina Narewka is a rural gmina (administrative district) in Hajnówka County, Podlaskie Voivodeship, in north-eastern Poland, on the border with Belarus.

It is one of five Polish/Belarusian bilingual Gmina in Podlaskie Voivodeship regulated by the Act of 6 January 2005 on National and Ethnic Minorities and on the Regional Languages, which permits certain gminas with significant linguistic minorities to introduce a second, auxiliary language to be used in official contexts alongside Polish.

Villages
Gmina Narewka contains the villages and settlements of Babia Góra, Baczyńscy, Bazylowe, Bernacki Most, Bielscy, Bokowe, Borowe, Chomińszczyzna, Cieremki, Dąbrowa, Eliaszuki, Gnilec, Grodzisk, Gruszki, Guszczewina, Janowo, Kapitańszczyzna, Kasjany, Kordon, Kruhlik, Krynica, Łańczyno, Leśna, Łozowe, Ludwinowo, Łuka, Maruszka, Michnówka, Mikłaszewo, Minkówka, Mostki, Narewka, Nowe Lewkowo, Nowe Masiewo, Nowiny, Ochrymy, Olchówka, Osowe, Pasieki, Planta, Podlewkowie, Połymie, Porosłe, Pręty, Siemianówka, Siemieniakowszczyzna, Skupowo, Słobódka, Smolnica, Stare Lewkowo, Stare Masiewo, Stary Dwór, Stoczek, Suszczy Borek, Świnoroje, Zabłotczyzna, Zabrody and Zamosze.

Neighbouring gminas
Gmina Narewka is bordered by the gminas of Białowieża, Hajnówka, Michałowo and Narew. It also borders Belarus.

References

Polish official population figures 2006

Narewka
Hajnówka County
Bilingual communes in Poland